Touria Sekkat (1935 Fes - Paris 1992) was a Moroccan writer of children's books. She worked as a teacher in Casablanca.

Books
Al-Labu´a al-bayd:â´ al-Nasr al-ramâdî H:iwâr ma'a al-amwâdj y Fât:ima al-mafdjű'a, Casablanca: Manshűrât Dâr al-At:fâl, 1988 (fairy tales)
Manâdîl wa-qud:bân. Rasâ´il al-sidjn, Casablanca: Dâr al-Nashr al-Magribiyya, 1988.
Ugniyât jâridh al-zamân, Casablanca: 'Uyűn al-Maqâlât, 1990. (songs)

References

Moroccan women writers
Moroccan children's writers
1935 births
1992 deaths
People from Fez, Morocco
Moroccan women children's writers
20th-century Moroccan women writers
20th-century Moroccan educators
Moroccan schoolteachers